Elna Reinach (born 2 December 1968) is a South African former professional tennis player.

With Patrick Galbraith, she won the US Open mixed doubles championship in 1994. She played in the 1992 Summer Olympics. Reinach was runner-up at the French Open with Danie Visser in 1993. Her brother, Fanie, coached her and their sister, Monica, as well as Lori McNeil, Lindsay Davenport, and Laura Gildemeister. After retiring in 1995, she had a daughter named Lané and another daughter named Liezel.

Grand Slam tournament finals

Mixed doubles: 2 (1 title, 1 runner-up)

WTA career finals

Singles: 2 (1 title, 1 runner-up)

Doubles: 19 (10 titles, 9 runner-ups)

ITF finals

Singles (6–1)

Doubles (7–2)

References

External links
 
 
 

South African female tennis players
Tennis players at the 1992 Summer Olympics
Olympic tennis players of South Africa
1968 births
Living people
Sportspeople from Pretoria
Grand Slam (tennis) champions in mixed doubles
US Open (tennis) champions
White South African people